Artyom Kryukov (born March 5, 1982) is a Russian former professional ice hockey forward who played in the Kontinental Hockey League (KHL). He was drafted by the Buffalo Sabres in the first round, 15th overall, of the 2000 NHL Entry Draft.

Playing career
Despite his high draft status, Kryukov has never played a professional game in North America, spending his entire career to date in his native Russia. He has played for Lokomotiv Yaroslavl. HC Sibir Novosibirsk, Vityaz Chekhov, and SKA Saint Petersburg in the Kontinental Hockey League. Kryukov missed the entire 2009–10 KHL season due to a knee injury suffered in the pre-season.

On May 19, 2014, Kryukov signed a one-year contract as a free agent with expansion club HC Sochi.

Career statistics

Honours
Russian championship:  2002 (with Lokomotiv Yaroslavl)

References

External links

1982 births
Living people
Amur Khabarovsk players
Avtomobilist Yekaterinburg players
Buffalo Sabres draft picks
HC Sibir Novosibirsk players
HC Sochi players
HC Vityaz players
Lokomotiv Yaroslavl players
National Hockey League first-round draft picks
Russian ice hockey centres
Severstal Cherepovets players
SKA Saint Petersburg players
Sportspeople from Novosibirsk